Republic of Crimea or Crimean Republic or variation, may refer to:

Republic of Crimea, a claimed federal subject of Russia;
Republic of Crimea (country), a short-lived country created by the Declaration of Independence of the Republic of Crimea in 2014. The country was only recognized by Russia;
Autonomous Republic of Crimea, the autonomous republic of Ukraine;
Crimean Autonomous Soviet Socialist Republic (1921–1945), autonomous Soviet Socialist republic within the Russian SFSR, in the Soviet Union;
Crimean ASSR (1991-1992), autonomous Soviet Socialist republic within the Ukrainian SFSR, in the Soviet Union;
Crimean People's Republic, a short-lived secular Muslim state which existed from December 1917 to January 1918;
Republic of Crimea (1992-1995), the government controlling Crimea in the immediate aftermath of the dissolution of the Soviet Union.

See also

 

 
 Crimea (disambiguation)
 Republic (disambiguation)